Price Hill is three neighborhoods of Cincinnati, Ohio, located north of Sedamsville and Riverside, south of Westwood and South Fairmount, and west of Queensgate. It is one of the oldest outlying settlements of Cincinnati, and includes parts of the zip codes 45205, 45238, and 45204.

Geography

Price Hill covers a little over six square miles, with over 31,000 residents. It is commonly subdivided into East Price Hill, West Price Hill, and Lower Price Hill.

As of 2010, 35.1% of the households had one person in the home and 64.9% had two people or more. According to the 2010 Census, 52.0% of the residents were white, 38.3% were black and 6.9% were Hispanic. The region contains part of Mt. Echo Park, Wilson Commons and Olden View Park as well as all of Glenway Woods, Glenway Park, Dempsey Playground and Mayfield Park.

As of 2010, 34.7% of the households had one person, 65.3% had two people or more living in the home. The 2010 Census lists 71.5% of the residents as white and 22.1% as black and 4.2% as Hispanic. The region includes Rapid Run Park, the Dunham Recreation Complex, Hendy Memorial Playground, Miles Edwards Park and Bruening Park.

Lower Price Hill is in the river valley to the southwest, comprising . It was also known as Eighth and State, getting that name from the major intersection at its center.  The 2010 Census lists the population as 1217, though it does not clearly demarc the line between Lower Price Hill and Queensgate, the neighboring industrial area that has little to no population.  The city police use the Mill Creek as the line where Lower Price Hill meets Queensgate.  As of 2010, 22.0% of the households had one person, 78.0% had two people or more living in the home. The 2010 Census lists 61.5% of the residents as white and 25.8% as black with the Hispanic population listed at 12.3%. The region includes part of Mount Echo Park, and the Lower Price Hill Historic District.

Demographics

History

Before the Symmes Purchase of the 1780s, the area of Price Hill was sparsely populated Indian territory. The remains of Indian burial mounds and lookout posts have been found in the region. Before Cincinnati annexed it beginning in 1870, Price Hill was divided between Delhi and Storrs townships.

Cincinnati became heavily populated in the 19th century, due to steamboat traffic and hog packing, and some of the city's wealthier residents settled in the nearly inaccessible hill country to the west. This region was high enough and far enough away to escape the pollution and crowdedness of the inner city. One such resident was General Rees E. Price, who purchased and developed large parts of the hill. The area was then called "Price's Hill", later shortened to "Price Hill".

A funicular called locally "the Incline" or "the Incline Plane" was built to help make the region more accessible. With its base on the corner of 8th Street and Glenway Avenue, the Incline climbed 350 feet over the top of the hill. Thanks to the Incline, by the 1870s there were thousands of residents. Most of the residents were Irish or German, and Catholic. The Eighth Street Viaduct was built by the end of the century, and the more accessible region became a thriving upper-middle-class suburb, with a commercial center along Glenway Avenue. Many of the houses that still stand in the district were built in the early years of the 20th century.

Mount St. Mary's Seminary of the West was first established on a  site at the northwest corner of Grand and Warsaw Avenues. The site was converted to a Catholic school devoted to the care and training of orphaned, dependent, and underprivileged girls.
Holy Family Parish was also located on this site. Seton High School was founded as Mount St. Vincent Academy, Cedar Grove in 1854 by the Sisters of Charity of Cincinnati. Union Baptist Cemetery was founded in 1864, it is the oldest Baptist African-American cemetery in Cincinnati.

When Cincinnati was plagued by tuberculosis in the early 20th century, Price Hill housed the Cincinnati Tubercular Hospital, one of the nation's leading centers for treatment and research. The hospital has since been converted into the Arts Center at Dunham, which boasts an Art Deco theater. A Carnegie library was built in Price Hill in 1909. The Covedale Theater was built in 1947.

Today, the Price Hill Community Center includes a fitness center, gym, youth programs, and senior programs.

Much of the area is being revitalized by a non-profit community development corporation known as Price Hill Will. Since 2004 this organization has helped to renovate houses, clean neighborhoods, and promote commercial and artistic opportunities in the region. One of their flagship programs is Music for Youth in Cincinnati (MYCincinnati), a free youth orchestra inspired by Venezuela's El Sistema.

Community
Price Hill is majority Catholic, and is a relatively tight-knit community. There is a community newspaper called "Price Hill Press" which serves the region. The four high schools in the region are Elder High School, Seton High School, Western Hills High School, and Gilbert A. Dater High School. The community is also formerly home to Cincinnati Christian University.  The following Catholic churches are in Price Hill:
Holy Family, Hawthorne Avenue and West Eighth Streets 
 Resurrection Church, 1750 1st Avenue
St. Lawrence Church, 3680 Warsaw Avenue
St. Michael the Archangel Church, Price Hill - Cincinnati, OH, lower Price Hill, closed April 5, 1998
St. Teresa of Avila, Glenway & Overlook Avenues
St. William Church, West Eight & Sunset Avenues

Several cemeteries are located in Price Hill including Old St. Joseph's Cemetery, New St. Joseph Cemetery, Union Baptist Cemetery and Judah Touro Cemetery.

Santa Maria Community Services has served the neighborhood for over 110 years.  They were founded to help Italian immigrants, but now focus on social services for mostly urban Appalachian and Hispanic clients.  They have also recently absorbed Literacy Center West, a non profit organization focusing on GED preparation and job readiness is located in Price Hill.

Price Hill Chili and the Covedale Center for the Performing Arts are neighborhood icons located in Price Hill as well.

Schools 

Carson Elementary - A public school serving Kindergarten through 6th grade.
Rees E. Price Academy - A public school serving Kindergarten through 6th grade.
Holy Family School - A Catholic school serving Pre-Kindergarten through 8th grade.
Resurrection School - A Catholic school serving Pre-Kindergarten through 8th grade.
Roberts Academy - A public school serving Pre-Kindergarten through 8th grade.
St. Lawrence School - A Catholic school serving Pre-Kindergarten through 8th grade.
St. Teresa of Avila - A Catholic school serving Pre-Kindergarten through 8th grade.
St. William - A Catholic school serving Pre-Kindergarten through 8th grade.
Covedale Elementary - A public school serving Kindergarten through 6th grade.
Dater Montessori - A public high school, not located in Price Hill but serving children who live in the neighborhood.
Western Hills University High School - A public high school serving children in Price Hill and other neighborhoods.
Elder High School - A Catholic boys high school.
Seton High School - A Catholic girls high school.
Mother of Mercy High School - A Catholic girls high school, not located in Price Hill but serving girls who live in the neighborhood.
Oyler School - A public school serving Kindergarten through high school.
IDEA Public School - A public charter school currently serving K-2 (Academy), and 6-7th grades (College Prep), and will eventually be K—12.

LandmarksBranch Hospital for Contagious Diseases  From 1897, this hospital was used for housing and treating victims of tuberculosis.  The hospital now forms part of the Dunham Recreation Center.Fire Company 24  Constructed in 1889, the fire station is now a private residence with a first-floor art gallery.
Mount Echo Park  Established in 1908, the  park is known as the viewing platform for one of the best views of Cincinnati's skyline.Price Hill Library  Finished in 1909, the library was one of the many libraries funded by Andrew Carnegie.  It is now a branch of the Cincinnati and Hamilton County Public Library system.The Covedale Center for the Performing Arts'

References

Further reading
 
 
 

Appalachian culture in Cincinnati
Neighborhoods in Cincinnati